The Institut supérieur européen de gestion group (ISEG group, French for Advanced European Institute of Management) is a group of two business schools, ISEG Marketing & Communication School and ISG Programme Business & Management, the former created in 1980, and the latter formed in 2014 when ISEG Business School and ISEG Finance School, each also founded in 1980, merged.
In September 2017, ISEG Business & Finance School merged with the programme Business & Management of the ISG Business School.
It is based in Paris, Bordeaux, Lille, Lyon, Nantes, Strasbourg and Toulouse, France. The group is mainly focused on teaching entrepreneurship.

History

Deployment in regions
The Institut supérieur européen de gestion was created in 1980 in Paris. After that, six other campuses has been opened in Bordeaux (1986), Toulouse (1987), Lille (1988), Nantes (1989), Strasbourg (1989) and Lyon (1990).

Extending the duration of studies
In 1990  new curriculums in four and five years after the Baccalauréat were introduced. In 1996, ISEG Paris moved to its new buildings, Rue des Francs-Bourgeois. In 1997, ISEG Bordeaux inaugurates a new campus. 
The concours PRISM (PRISM competitive examination) was launched in 2001, one year before new five-year curriculums were introduced. In 2003/2004, new buildings were inaugurated in Paris, Bordeaux, Lyon and Toulouse, and in 2007 in Strasbourg.

A group of three autonomous universities
In 2010, the creation of ISEG Group brought together three autonomous universities. 
The three universities have a degree recognized level 1 by CNCP and are members of AACSB.

In September 2014, a new digital and innovative campus will open in Paris (Le Marais-Bastille) bringing together the group, Sup'Internet and E-Artsup.

Merger
In September 2014, ISEG Business School and ISEG Finance School merged to create a new school named ISEG Business & Finance School.
In September 2017, ISEG Business & Finance School merged with the programme Business & Management of the ISG Business School.

Notable people

Teachers and former teachers
 Fabrice Bardeche, Vice-President of IONIS Education Group

References

External links 
  Official website
(in French) 2Ai - L'association des anciens de l'ISEG

Business schools in France
Education in Nouvelle-Aquitaine
Education in Lille
Education in Lyon
Education in Nantes
Education in Paris
Education in Strasbourg
Education in Toulouse
Educational institutions established in 1980